The Forry's Mill Covered Bridge is a covered bridge that spans Chiques Creek in West Hempfield in Lancaster County, Pennsylvania, United States.    A county-owned and maintained bridge, its official designation is the Big Chiques #7 Bridge. (Chiques Creek was known as Chickies Creek until 2002).

The bridge has a single span, wooden, double Burr arch trusses design with the addition of steel hanger rods. The deck is made from oak planks. It is painted red, the traditional color of Lancaster County covered bridges, on both the inside and outside. Both approaches to the bridge are painted in the traditional white color.

The bridge's WGCB Number is 38-36-28.  In 1980 it was added to the National Register of Historic Places as structure number 80003512.  It is located at  (40.06767, -76.47800).

History 
Forry's Mill Covered Bridge was originally built in 1869 by Elias McMellen for a cost of $2969. The bridge required repairs in 1925 to its sides and floor.

Dimensions 

Length: 91 feet  span and  total length
Width:  clear deck and  total width
Overhead clearance: 
Underclearance:

Gallery

See also
Burr arch truss
List of Lancaster County covered bridges

References 

Covered bridges in Lancaster County, Pennsylvania
Bridges completed in 1869
Covered bridges on the National Register of Historic Places in Pennsylvania
1869 establishments in Pennsylvania
National Register of Historic Places in Lancaster County, Pennsylvania
Road bridges on the National Register of Historic Places in Pennsylvania
Wooden bridges in Pennsylvania
Burr Truss bridges in the United States